The Holocaust—the murder of about six million Jews by Nazi Germany from 1941 to 1945—is the best-documented genocide in history. Although there is no single document which lists all Jewish victims of Nazi persecution, there is conclusive evidence that about six million were murdered. There is also conclusive evidence that Jews were gassed at Auschwitz-Birkenau, the Operation Reinhard extermination camps, and in gas vans, and that there was a systematic plan by the Nazi leadership to murder them.

Evidence for the Holocaust comes in four main varieties:

Contemporary documents, including a wide variety of "letters, memos, blueprints, orders, bills, speeches"; Holocaust train schedules and statistical summaries generated by the SS; and photographs, including official photographs, clandestine photographs by survivors, aerial photographs, and film footage of the liberation of the camps. More than 3,000 tons of records were collected for the Nuremberg trials.
Later testimony from tens of thousands of eyewitnesses, including survivors such as Sonderkommandos, who directly witnessed the extermination process; perpetrators such as Nazi leaders, SS guards, and Nazi concentration camp commandants; and local townspeople. Moreover, virtually none of the perpetrators put on trial denied the reality of the systematic murder, with the most common excuse (where one was given) being that they were just following orders.
Material evidence in the form of concentration and extermination camps, which still exist with various amounts of the original structure preserved, and thousands of mass graves containing the corpses of Holocaust victims.
Circumstantial evidence: during World War II, the population of Jews in German-occupied Europe was reduced by about six million. About 2.7 million Jews were deported to Auschwitz-Birkenau, Kulmhof extermination camp, and the Operation Reinhard camps never to be seen or heard from again.

The perpetrators attempted to avoid creating explicit evidence and tried to destroy the documentary and material evidence of their crimes before the German defeat. Nevertheless, much of the evidence was preserved and collected by Allied investigators during and after the war, and the overwhelming evidence of the crimes ultimately made such erasure attempts futile. Collectively, the evidence refutes the arguments of Holocaust deniers that the Holocaust did not occur as described in historical scholarship.

Hitler's involvement

Policy 

Historians, including Ian Kershaw, Raul Hilberg, and Martin Broszat, indicate that no document exists showing that Hitler ordered the Holocaust. However, other evidence makes clear that Hitler knew about and ordered the genocide. Statements from Adolf Eichmann, Joseph Goebbels, and Heinrich Himmler also indicate that Hitler orchestrated the Holocaust and statements from Hitler himself reveal his genocidal intentions toward Jewry.

Order and responsibility

In a draft of an internal memorandum, dated 18 September 1942, Reichsfuhrer SS Heinrich Himmler wrote that "in principle the Fuehrer's time is no longer to be burdened with these matters"; the memorandum goes on to outline Himmler's vision, including "The delivery of anti-social elements from the execution of their sentences to the Reich Fuehrer of SS to be worked to death. Persons under protective arrest, Jews, Gypsies, Russians and Ukrainians, Poles with more than 3-year sentences, Czechs and Germans with more than 8-year sentences according to the judgement of the Minister of Justice [Thierack]. First of all, the worst anti-social elements amongst those just mentioned are to be handed over; I shall inform the Fuhrer of this through Reichsleiter Bormann."

Nevertheless, and in contrast to the T4 euthanasia program, no document written or signed by Hitler ordering the Holocaust has ever been found. Deniers have claimed that this lack of order shows genocide was not Nazi policy.

During David Irving's unsuccessful libel action against Deborah Lipstadt, he indicated that he considered a document signed by Hitler ordering the 'Final Solution' would be the only convincing proof of Hitler's responsibility. He was, however, described as content to accuse Winston Churchill of responsibility for ordering the assassination of General Sikorski, despite having no documentary evidence to support his claim. Mr Justice Gray concluded that this was a double standard.

Historians have documented evidence that as Germany's defeat became imminent and the Nazi leaders realized they would most likely be captured and brought to trial, great effort was made to destroy all evidence of mass extermination. In the spring of 1942, Himmler ordered all traces of murdered Russian Jews and prisoners of war to be removed from occupied territories of the Soviet Union.  As one of many examples, the bodies of the 25,000 mostly Latvian Jews whom Friedrich Jeckeln and the soldiers under his command had shot at Rumbula (near Riga) in late 1941 were dug up and burned in 1943.

In mid-1942, Reinhard Heydrich, through Heinrich Mueller, Chief of the Gestapo, ordered Paul Blobel in Sonderaktion 1005 to remove all traces of the mass executions in the East carried out by the Einsatzgruppen. After Blobel and his staff developed a special incineration process, destruction of evidence at Belzec and Sobibor followed in late 1942. In February 1943, Himmler personally visited Treblinka and ordered the commandants to destroy records, crematoria, and other signs of mass extermination.

In the Posen speeches of October 1943, Himmler explicitly referred to the extermination of the Jews of Europe and further stated that the genocide must be permanently kept secret. On 4 October, he said:

Historian Peter Longerich states that Hitler "avoided giving a clear written order to exterminate Jewish civilians. Wide protest was evoked when Hitler's authorisation of the T4 program became public knowledge in Germany, and he was forced to put a halt to it as a result (nonetheless it continued discreetly). This made Hitler realise that such undertakings must be done secretly in order to avoid criticism. Critics also point out that if Hitler did sign such an order in the first place, it would have been one of the first documents to be destroyed."

According to Felix Kersten's memoirs, Himmler told him that the extermination of the Jews was expressly ordered by Hitler and had been delegated to Himmler.

According to Nazis
Many statements from the Nazis from 1941 onwards addressed the imminent extermination of the Jews.

In a draft of an internal memorandum, dated 25 October 1941, Heinrich Himmler wrote:

Joseph Goebbels had frequent discussions with Hitler about the fate of the Jews, a subject which they discussed almost every time they met, and frequently wrote about it in his personal diary. In his personal diary he wrote:

14 February 1942: "The Führer once again expressed his determination to clean up the Jews in Europe pitilessly. There must be no squeamish sentimentalism about it. The Jews have deserved the catastrophe that has now overtaken them. Their destruction will go hand in hand with the destruction of our enemies. We must hasten this process with cold ruthlessness."
27 March 1942: A judgment is being visited upon the Jews that, while barbaric, is fully deserved by them. The prophecy which the Führer made about them for having brought on a new world war is beginning to come true in a most terrible manner. One must not be sentimental in these matters. If we did not fight the Jews, they would destroy us. It's a life-and-death struggle between the Aryan race and the Jewish bacillus.

In November 1941, Goebbels published an article "The Jews are to blame" which returned to Hitler's prophecy of 1939 and stated that world Jewry was suffering a "gradual process of extermination".

On 13 March 1945, Goebbels wrote in his diary that the "rest of the world" should follow Germany's example in "destroying the Jews", he wrote also about how the Jews in Germany at that point had been almost totally destroyed. This diary contains numerous other references to the mass extermination of Jews, including how "tens of thousands of them are liquidated" in eastern occupied territory, and that "the greater the number of Jews liquidated, the more consolidated will the situation in Europe be after this war." When speaking about this document under oath, David Irving is quoted as saying "There is no explicit reference...to the liquidation of Jews" and critics of Holocaust denial consequently state that it is dishonest to say such a thing when it is entirely contradicted by the diary of one of Hitler's closest associates.

When questioned by interrogators if orders for the extermination of Jews were delegated in writing by Himmler, Adolf Eichmann states:

Critics state that Eichmann gives a virtually identical account of this in his memoirs, and state that it is also asserted that Eichmann never even asked for a written order, on the basis that "Hitler's wish as expressed through Himmler and Heydrich was good enough for him". Eichmann's memoirs were recorded by Willem Sassen before he was captured, and Eichmann's lawyer tried to prevent them from being presented as evidence to avoid any detriment against his case.

In a speech, David Irving states that Heydrich told Eichmann, "The Führer has given the order for the physical destruction of the Jews". Irving admits that this contradicts his view that "Hitler wasn't involved", but explains it by suggesting that a completely different meaning can be construed, i.e. "the extirpation of Judaism" as opposed to the physical destruction of Jews if one changes "just one or two words". Critics of this view state that historians should not change words if their documents contradict their claims, and consequently point out five instances where Eichmann unambiguously states "physical extermination" during his interrogation.

At a conference in 1941 discussing the Jewish Question, Alfred Rosenberg said:

Awareness

Congruent with the evidence that shows Hitler was responsible for the order to murder Jews, there is also evidence that shows he was made aware of the process. Gestapo Chief Heinrich Müller sent a telegram on 2 August 1941, ordering that "especially interesting illustrative" material should be sent to Berlin because, "the Führer should be presented with continuous reports on the work of Einsatzgruppen in the East from here". At the end of December 1942 Hitler received a document from Himmler entitled, "Report to the Führer on Combating Partisans", stating that 363,211 Jews had been murdered by the Einsatzgruppen in August–November 1942. This document was specifically printed in large font that Hitler could read without glasses and was marked "Shown to the Führer".

Himmler's speeches and "Ausrottung"

Critics of Holocaust denial state that the claim by deniers of no Nazi plan to exterminate the Jews is completely discredited by Himmler in a speech made on 4 October 1943 to a gathering of SS officers in Poznań, where he said:

Use of gas chambers

Despite the difficulty of finding traces of this material 50 years later, in February 1990, Professor Jan Markiewicz, Director of the Institute of Forensic Research in Kraków, redid the analysis. Markiewicz and his team used microdiffusion techniques to test for cyanide in samples from the suspected gas chambers, from delousing chambers, and from control areas elsewhere within Auschwitz. The control samples tested negative, while cyanide residue was found in high concentrations in the delousing chambers, and lower concentrations in the homicidal gas chambers. This is consistent with the amounts required to kill lice and humans.

The search for cyanide in the bricks of buildings said to be gas chambers was important, because the pesticide Zyklon B would generate such a residue. This was the gas most often cited as the murder instrument for prisoners in the gas chambers, supported by both testimony and evidence collected of Nazi policy.

Another claim made by Holocaust deniers is that there were no specially-constructed vents in the gas chambers through which Zyklon B could be released. The BBC offers a response showing that this requires disregard of much documentation:

Deniers have said for years that physical evidence is lacking because they have seen no holes in the roof of the Birkenau gas chamber where the Zyklon was poured in. (In some of the gas chambers the Zyklon B was poured in through the roof, while in others it was thrown in through the windows.) The roof was dynamited at war's end, and today lies broken in pieces, but three of the four original holes were positively identified in a recent paper. Their location in the concrete matches with eyewitness testimony, aerial photos from 1944, and a ground photo from 1943. The physical evidence shows unmistakably that the Zyklon holes were cast into the concrete when the building was constructed.

Cremation in the open at the Reinhard extermination camps (Treblinka, Sobibor and Belzec) was discussed at Nuremberg on 7 April 1946 by Georg Konrad Morgen, SS judge and lawyer who investigated crimes committed in Nazi concentration camps. He stated: "The whole thing was like an assembly line. At the last stop they reached a big room, and were told that this was the bath. When the last one was in, the doors were shut and the gas was let into the room. As soon as death taken place in (sic), the ventilators were started. When the air was breathable, the doors were opened, and the Jewish workers removed the bodies. By means of a special process which Wirth had invented, they were burned in the open air without the use of fuel."

There is well-documented evidence that other ash was used as fertilizer in nearby fields. Photographs of Treblinka taken by the camp commandant show what looks to be ash piles being distributed by steam shovels.

The Nizkor Project and other sources have stated that the minimal concentration of Zyklon-B to be explosive is 56,000 parts per million, while 300 parts per million is fatal to humans, as is evidenced in The Merck Index and the CRC Handbook of Chemistry and Physics. In fact, the Nazis' own documentation stated "Danger of explosion: 75 grams of HCN in 1 cubic meter of air. Normal application approx. 8–10 grams per cubic meter, therefore not explosive."

The Institute for Historical Review publicly offered a reward of $50,000 for verifiable "proof that gas chambers for the purpose of killing human beings existed at or in Auschwitz." Mel Mermelstein, a survivor of Auschwitz, submitted his own testimony as proof but it was ignored. He then sued IHR in the United States and the case was subsequently settled for $50,000, plus $40,000 in damages for personal suffering. The court declared the statement that "Jews were gassed to death at the Auschwitz Concentration Camp in Poland during the summer of 1944" was a fact.

Victims

Six million

The vast majority of scholars, institutions, and Nazi officials estimate between five and six million Jews perished during the Holocaust. With approximately 4.5 million Jewish victims' names collected by Yad Vashem, numerous documents and archives discovered after the war gave meticulous accounts of the exterminations that took place at the death camps (such as Auschwitz and Treblinka).

Jewish population
The 1932 American Jewish Yearbook estimates the total number of Jews in the world at 15,192,218, of whom 9,418,248 resided in Europe. However, the 1947 yearbook states: "Estimates of the world Jewish population have been assembled by the American Jewish Joint Distribution Committee (except for the United States and Canada) and are probably the most authentic available at the present time. The figures reveal that the total Jewish population of the world has decreased by one-third from about 16,600,000 in 1939 to about 11,000,000 in 1946 as the result of the annihilation by the Nazis of more than five and a half million European Jews. In Europe only an estimated 3,642,000 remain of the total Jewish pre-war population of approximately 9,740,000." These numbers are also consistent with the findings of the Anglo-American Committee of Inquiry, Appendix III, in 1946.

Nazi documentation

The Nazis used figures of between 9 and 11 million for the Jewish population of Europe, as evidenced in the notes of the Wannsee Conference. In fact, the Nazis methodically recorded the ongoing reduction of the Jewish population, as in the Korherr Report, which gave the status of the Final Solution through December 1942. The Höfle Telegram was sent by Hermann Höfle on 11 January 1943 to Adolf Eichmann in Berlin and detailed the number of Jews murdered in the concentration camps. In the year 1942 alone, the telegram lists 1,274,166 Jews were exterminated in the four camps of Aktion Reinhard.

The Korherr Report, compiled by an SS statistician, gave a conservative total of 2,454,000 Jews deported to extermination camps or murdered by the Einsatzgruppen. The complete status reports of the Einsatzgruppen death squads were found in the archives of the Gestapo when it was searched by the U.S. Army, and the accuracy attested to by the former Einsatzgruppen members who testified during war crime trials and at other times. These reports alone list an additional 1,500,000 or so murders during mass shootings, the vast majority of these victims were Jews. Further, surviving Nazi documentation spells out their plans to murder the Jews of Europe (see the Wannsee Conference), recorded the trains arriving at various death camps, and included photographs and films of many atrocities.

Testimonies
There are voluminous amounts of testimony from tens of thousands of survivors of the Holocaust, as well as the testimony of captured Nazi officers at the Nuremberg Trials and other times. Höss's testimony did not consist of merely a signed confession; while in jail he also wrote two volumes of memoirs and gave extensive testimony outside of the Nuremberg proceedings. Further, his testimony agrees with that of other contemporary written accounts by Auschwitz officials, such as Pery Broad, an SS man stationed at Auschwitz while Höss was the commandant and the diary kept by SS physician at Auschwitz Johann Kremer, as well as the testimony of hundreds of camp guards and victims. In addition, former SS personnel have criticised Holocaust denial. SS-Oberscharführer Josef Klehr said that anyone who maintains that nobody was gassed at Auschwitz must be "crazy or on the wrong". SS-Unterscharführer Oswald Kaduk stated that he did not consider those who maintain such a thing as normal people. Hearing about Holocaust denial compelled former SS-Rottenführer Oskar Gröning to publicly speak about what he witnessed at Auschwitz, and denounce Holocaust deniers, stating:

Hans Münch, a former SS physician, signed a document certifying what he witnessed at Auschwitz: "thousands of people gassed", and the usage of Zyklon B in gas chambers. According to Münch's estimation, prisoners died within three to five minutes of exposure to Zyklon B.

Sonderkommandos provide another key piece of testimony. There were Jewish prisoners who helped march Jews to the gas chambers, and later dragged the bodies to the crematoria. Since they witnessed the entire process, their testimony is vital in confirming that the gas chambers were used for murderous purposes and the scale to which they were used.

Other key testimony comes from non-Jewish survivors of the camps such as Catholic French Resistance member André Rogerie who was held in seven different camps, and who as a member of the Resistance was not targeted for extermination but for hard labor and survived.  After the war Rogerie wrote and testified extensively about his experiences in the camps including Auschwitz-Birkenau where he viewed and produced the oldest contemporary sketch of a camp crematorium.

References

Citations

Sources

 
  (Frankfurt a. M., Berlin, Wien 1974)
 
 
  Actual text of the judgment in the Irving case.
 
 
 
 
 
 
 
 
 
 
 
 

Holocaust denial
The Holocaust